The 1998 Labatt Brier was held from March 8 to 15 at the Winnipeg Arena in Winnipeg, Manitoba. Wayne Middaugh of Ontario won his second Brier and his first as a skip after he defeated Guy Hemmings of Quebec in the final.

Teams

Round-robin standings

Round-robin results

Draw 1

Draw 2

Draw 3

Draw 4

Draw 5

Draw 6

Draw 7

Draw 8

Draw 9

Draw 10

Draw 11

Draw 12

Draw 13

Draw 14

Draw 15

Draw 16

Draw 17

Tiebreaker

Playoffs

3 vs. 4

1 vs. 2

Semifinal

Final

Statistics

Top 5 player percentages
Round Robin only

Team percentages
Round Robin only

References

External links
1998 Labatt Brier - archived statistics - Canadian Curling Association

The Brier
Labatt Brier
1998 in Canadian curling
Curling competitions in Winnipeg